Adrien Giunta (born 1 June 2001) is a Belgian professional footballer who plays as a forward.

References 

2001 births
Living people
Belgian footballers
Association football forwards
Standard Liège players
K.A.A. Gent players
K.A.S. Eupen players
Torino F.C. players
FC Lugano players
Royal Excel Mouscron players
Challenger Pro League players
Belgian expatriate footballers
Expatriate footballers in the Netherlands
Expatriate footballers in Italy
Expatriate footballers in Switzerland
Belgian expatriate sportspeople in the Netherlands
Belgian expatriate sportspeople in Italy
Belgian expatriate sportspeople in Switzerland